Norman Pugh (3 April 1911 – death unknown), also known by the nickname of "The Whip", was a Welsh rugby union and professional rugby league footballer who played in the 1930s and 1940s.

Background
Norman Pugh was born in Godre'r Graig, Neath Port Talbot, Wales.

International honours
Norman Pugh won 6 caps for Wales in 1935–1938 while at Oldham.

References

External links
(archived by web.archive.org) Statistics at orl-heritagetrust.org.uk

1911 births
Glamorgan County RFC players
Oldham R.L.F.C. captains
Oldham R.L.F.C. players
Place of death missing
Rugby league locks
Rugby league players from Neath Port Talbot
Rugby league second-rows
Rugby union players from Neath Port Talbot
Swansea RFC players
Wales national rugby league team players
Welsh rugby league players
Welsh rugby union players
Year of death missing